Mikołajczyk is a Polish surname derived from the name Mikołaj (Nicholas). Notable people with the surname include:

 Erwin Mikolajczyk (died 1994), perpetrator of the 1994 Euskirchen court shooting
 Helena Mikołajczyk (born 1968), Polish biathlete
 Ron Mikolajczyk (born 1950), American football player
 Stanisław Mikołajczyk (1901-1966), prime minister of the Polish government-in-exile during World War II

Polish-language surnames